Patrick Fischler (born December 29, 1969) is an American character actor known for his roles as Jimmy Barrett on the drama series Mad Men, Dharma Initiative worker Phil on the drama series Lost and Detective Kenny No-Gun on the police drama Southland. He has more than sixty film and television credits, including the films Mulholland Drive (2001), Ghost World (2001), Old School (2003), The Black Dahlia (2006), and Dinner for Schmucks (2010).

In 2011, Fischler portrayed real-life gangster Mickey Cohen in the video game L.A. Noire using facial performance-capture technology to convert performances in the game's graphics. In 2012, he appeared in One for the Money, a crime thriller adapted from Janet Evanovich's novel of the same name. In 2013, he played gangster Meyer Lansky in scenes with Cohen's character in the TNT miniseries Mob City.

The Santa Monica restaurant Patrick's Roadhouse was started by his father and is named for him.

Early life
Fischler was born on December 29, 1969. His father, Bill, bought a restaurant on the Pacific Coast Highway in Santa Monica, California, while Fischler was five years old, and named it "Patrick's Roadhouse" after him. The restaurant is a 'hot-spot' for celebrities Arnold Schwarzenegger, Sean Penn, Goldie Hawn, and Johnny Carson. After graduating from high school, Fischler attended New York University's Tisch School of the Arts; there, he met and started dating his future wife, actress Lauren Bowles, half-sister of actress Julia Louis-Dreyfus.

Career
After graduating from Tisch, Fischler and Bowles moved back to Los Angeles; there, along with other New York University graduates, they formed a theater group called Neurotic Young Urbanites. An agent saw Fischler perform at a Neurotic Young Urbanites production, then arranged for him to attend an audition for the 1994 action film Speed, Fischler's first film acting job. In the film, Fischler played one of the men trapped inside an elevator but which nearly falls due to an attack by a bomber.

In 1998, Fischler starred in the independent film The Week That Girl Died, a romantic comedy about three long-time friends in a small New England fishing town. For the part, he received a best lead actor award by the American Film Institute International Film Festival's New Directions jury, which honors independent films. Fischler appeared in David Lynch's 2001 psychological thriller Mulholland Drive as a man describing a nightmare he had. 2002, he appeared in the television film Gilda Radner: It's Always Something, a biopic about comedian Gilda Radner; he portrayed Eugene Levy. He appeared in the films Twister (1996), Ghost World (2001), and Old School (2003). and The Great Buck Howard (2008),,  and portrayed Ellis Loew in Brian De Palma's 2006 crime film The Black Dahlia. The character was referred to in the film as "Jewboy"; film reviewer Stephen Cole called his role "a caricature as coarsely anti-Jew as any sequence in Mel Gibson’s The Passion of the Christ."  Fischler appeared as a guest star in television shows Angel, Nash Bridges, Burn Notice, Lie to Me, Bones, Cold Case, Monk, Star Trek: Enterprise, Girlfriends, CSI: Crime Scene Investigation, CSI: Miami, and CSI: NY. By 2009, he had more than 60 film and television credits.

Increased recognition
Fischler auditioned for the role of insult comic Jimmy Barrett on the AMC drama series Mad Men, of which he was a fan. Alex Witchel, a writer from The New York Times Magazine who sat in on Fischler's audition, said he was "breathtakingly good". The character, Jimmy Barrett, is a client of the advertising company within the show, and his wife Bobbie sleeps with protagonist Don Draper. Series creator and executive producer Matthew Weiner cast Fischler because he felt the actor had a "New York quality" that he wanted the character to have. Weiner said of him: "Patrick has this tremendous edge. There was something very old-fashioned about the way he dealt with the character." Fischler said entertainer Joey Bishop was a major influence on how he played the role because he wanted Jimmy Barrett to have a charming element to him and make people laugh even while he said horrible things, as Bishop did. Fischler received a great deal of exposure and increase in name recognition after his role on Mad Men. During one episode, Jimmy tells Don's wife Betty about her husband's infidelity, then confronts Don and tells him off about his cheating. Fischler called receiving that script "the highlight of my career so far", adding: "After Mad Men I got a lot of 'How dare you speak to Don Draper like that? ... People, mainly women, were mad at me that I told Don off. I took it as a compliment." Fischler had been in talks to appear on the Showtime drama series Californication, and ended up appearing in four episodes.

Starting in 2009, Fischler became a recurring cast member on both the ABC drama series Lost and the NBC police drama Southland. He was cast in Lost immediately after the pilot for Southland was filmed and worked on both shows over the course of six months. To do so, he constantly flew back and forth between Hawaii, where Lost is filmed, and Los Angeles, where Southland is filmed, while simultaneously dealing with his wife's pregnancy. Fischler said the Lost producers were "incredibly accommodating" to his schedule. On Southland he played Detective Kenny No-Gun; series creator Ann Biderman described him as a "brilliant, incredibly versatile actor". Although originally expected to appear in only two Lost episodes, he ended up guest starring in nine, appearing in the fifth season as Phil, a member of the Dharma Initiative during a part of the show set in 1977. When he auditioned for the role, Fischler did not know the storyline would move from the present to the past, and did not learn this until he was handed his first script. In a May 2009 interview, Fischler said, "This is not a joke: a year ago if you were to ask me what are the two shows I want to be on, I would have said Mad Men and Lost."

Recent projects
Fischler appeared in the 2010 comedy film Dinner for Schmucks as Vincenzo, one of the guests at a dinner where rich people bring eccentric guests and compete for who can bring the biggest loser. In the film, Fischler's character has a pet vulture, which he feeds by chewing food and spitting it directly into the bird's mouth. Fischler also portrayed the real-life gangster Mickey Cohen in the video game L.A. Noire, which was released in May 2011. The game uses a facial performance-capture technology called MotionScan to record the performances of actors, then convert them to the graphics of the game. The game's casting directors worked on Mad Men and specifically approached Fischler for the Cohen character, and he accepted because he likes the film noir genre. Fischler said of the experience: "You really get to act in those scenes cause they’re capturing every moment on your face. A slight smile. A small frown. Everything."

Fischler appeared in Red State as ATF Agent Hammond in 2011.

In January 2012, Fischler appeared in One for the Money, a crime thriller film adapted from the 1994 novel of the same name by Janet Evanovich, the first in a series featuring bounty hunter Stephanie Plum. He portrayed Vinnie Plum, a bail bondsman and Stephanie Plum's cousin. He portrayed poet Lew Welch in the 2013 Michael Polish film Big Sur, based on the autobiographical novel by Jack Kerouac. He played the antagonistic Author in the second half of the fourth season of ABC's Once Upon a Time. In 2016, he appeared in The Coen brothers' Hail, Caesar!

Personal life
Fischler and Lauren Bowles were married in 2004. They have a daughter named Fia Lucille (born April 2009).

Filmography

Film

Television

Video games

References

External links

Living people
1969 births
Circle in the Square Theatre School alumni
Tisch School of the Arts alumni
Male actors from Los Angeles
American male television actors
American male film actors
20th-century American male actors
21st-century American male actors